Besarion Udessiani, known as Besso Udessiani (born Tbilisi, 14 March 1978) is a Georgian rugby union player. He plays as number-eight.

Udessiani played in France for Châlon, Saint-Étienne (2009/10) and Mâcon, since 2010/11.

He had 42 caps for Georgia, from 2001 to 2011, scoring 8 tries, 40 points on aggregate. He was called for the 2007 Rugby World Cup, playing in two games but without scoring.

References

External links
Besso Udessiani International Statistics

1978 births
Living people
Rugby union players from Georgia (country)
Rugby union number eights
Georgia international rugby union players
Rugby union players from Tbilisi